A Midsummer Night's Sex Comedy is a 1982 American sex comedy film written and directed by Woody Allen, starring Allen and Mia Farrow.

The plot is loosely based on Swedish filmmaker Ingmar Bergman's 1955 comedy film Smiles of a Summer Night. It was the first of thirteen films that Allen would make starring Farrow. Her role was originally written for Diane Keaton, another Allen collaborator, but Keaton was preoccupied promoting Reds and preparing production on Shoot the Moon. Julie Hagerty, Mary Steenburgen, Tony Roberts and Jose Ferrer co-star. It also marks the first appearance of Allen as an ensemble performer in his own film, as previously he had either been the lead character or did not appear at all.

A Midsummer Night's Sex Comedy received positive reviews and was a minor commercial success. However, it was nominated for one Razzie Award for Worst Actress, for Farrow – the only time an Allen film has been nominated for a Razzie.

Plot 
It is 1906 in upstate New York. Distinguished philosopher Leopold and his much younger fiancée, Ariel, are going to spend a weekend in the country with Leopold's cousin Adrian, and her crackpot inventor husband Andrew. Also on the guest list is womanizing doctor, Maxwell, and his latest girlfriend, a free-thinking nurse, Dulcy. Over the course of the weekend, old romances reignite, new romances develop, and everyone ends up sneaking off behind everyone else's backs.

Cast

Background 
Allen explained the inspiration for the film:

Soundtrack 

 Symphony No.3 in A Minor (1842) - Written by Felix Mendelssohn - Performed by Leonard Bernstein and the New York Philharmonic
 Violin Concerto in E Minor, Opus 64 (1844) - Written by Felix Mendelssohn - Performed by Vasil Stefanov and the TVR Symphony Orchestra
 Piano Concerto No. 2 in D Minor, Opus 40 (1837) - Written by Felix Mendelssohn - Performed by Eugene Ormandy and The Philadelphia Orchestra
 A Midsummer Night's Dream (1826) - Written by Felix Mendelssohn - Performed by Eugene Ormandy and The Philadelphia Orchestra

 Die schöne Müllerin, D795 No.2: 'Wohin? (1823) - Written by Franz Schubert - Played on piano by Mary Steenburgen
 Dichterliebe, Opus 48, No.7: Ich grolle nicht (1840) - Written by Robert Schumann - Played on piano by Mary Steenburgen
 The Lord's Prayer (1935) - music by Albert Hay Malotte - Played on piano by Mia Farrow

Release 
The film opened on July 16, 1982, at 501 North American theaters, and made $2,514,478 ($5,018 per screen) in its opening weekend. It grossed $9,077,269 in its entire run.

Reception 
The film has a 74% on Rotten Tomatoes based on 27 reviews with the critics' consensus being "It may not [be] Woody Allen's best work, but the frothy, fun A Midsummer Night's Sex Comedy is still worth a look."

Janet Maslin of The New York Times wrote, "Whatever Mr. Allen is doing in constructing this pretty, slight, gently entertaining movie, he isn't doing the thing he does best. 'A Midsummer Night's Sex Comedy' gives the impression of someone speaking fluently but formally in a language not his own." Roger Ebert gave the film two stars out of four and explained, "I don't object to 'A Midsummer Night's Sex Comedy' on grounds that it's different from his earlier films, but on the more fundamental ground that it's adrift. There doesn't seem to be a driving idea behind it, a confident tone to give us the sure notion that Allen knows what he wants to do here." Gene Siskel awarded two-and-a-half stars out of four, calling it "a nice picture, but insubstantial." Variety called the film "a pleasant disappointment, pleasant because [Allen] gets all the laughs he goes for in a visually charming, sweetly paced picture, a disappointment because he doesn't go for more." Sheila Benson of the Los Angeles Times wrote, "What's most disappointing about 'Sex Comedy' is that for all its incessant—and anachronistic—talk, there's a serious shortage of new ideas from writer-director Allen. The film's fullest idea is that opportunity, once lost, can never again be recaptured. We might have hoped for this bittersweetness and a great deal more from one of the screen's nerviest innovators." Gary Arnold of The Washington Post stated, "The crucial problem with 'Sex Comedy' is that one detects no persuasive sexual chemistry in any of the alleged, three-cornered mating games. It's impossible to believe that anyone's susceptibilities are deeply stirred or anyone's feelings likely to be hurt. Allen can't establish the basic sense of attraction and the emotional gravity that underscores the frivolity of the romantic hide-and-seek." Pauline Kael of The New Yorker wrote, "The group is rather amusing, and for a while the film seems saucy and fairly promising (when we learn, for example, that the prof and his fiancée met at the Vatican). Viewers may feel that everything must be building toward a big, explosive joke. But nothing really develops—not even the clashes that are prepared for. Nothing busts loose."

References

External links 

 
 
 
 
 
 

1982 films
1982 comedy films
1980s American films
1980s English-language films
1980s sex comedy films
American sex comedy films
Films based on works by Ingmar Bergman
Films directed by Woody Allen
Films produced by Robert Greenhut
Films set in the 1900s
Films set in country houses
Films set in New York (state)
Films set in Columbia University
Films shot in New York City
Films with screenplays by Woody Allen
Orion Pictures films
Warner Bros. films